Masdevallia bulbophyllopsis is a species of orchid endemic to southwestern Ecuador.

References

External links 

bulbophyllopsis
Endemic flora of Ecuador
Epiphytic orchids